Inter Milan may refer to:
 F.C. Internazionale Milano S.p.A., commonly known as just Inter Milan, is an Italian football club.
 Inter Milan Youth Sector, youth team of Inter Milan
 Accademia Internazionale Calcio, an affiliated youth club of Inter Milan, that based in Milan
 Milan-Inter HC, a defunct ice hockey team.

See also
 Inter (disambiguation)
 Internacional (disambiguation)
 Internazionale (disambiguation)